Alain Rémond is a famous French humor columnist, born in 1946 in  Mortain (Manche).

Biography
Alain Rémond was born into a modest Breton family. He studied philosophy, became a teacher of audiovisual moving later on to film review.

In 1973, Alain got a job in Télérama where he created the well-known and hilarious column "Mon oeil" (which means both "My eye" and "I don't believe you"). He became an editor and continued until 2002.

Now, he writes in the centrist Marianne (but has said he voted for Ségolène Royal in French presidential Election of 2007) and in the Catholic La Croix.

He has published many books about his idols like Yves Montand or Bob Dylan, and has written about his childhood.

See also 
Marianne
La Croix
 Ernestine Chassebœuf

External links
|Blog about Alain Rémond

1946 births
Living people
French columnists
French male non-fiction writers
People from Manche